SAFA may refer to:

 SAFA (architecture), professional body representing architects in Finland
 SAFA programme, a European aviation safety program
 Scottish Amateur Football Association
 South African Football Association
 South Asian Federation of Accountants
 South Australian Football Association, an early name (1877–1906) of the South Australian National Football League
 Scott's Anti-Foundation Axiom

See also
 Safa (disambiguation)
 Saffa (disambiguation)